The 2022 Kehoe Cup was an inter-county hurling competition in the province of Leinster, played by four county teams. It was the second level of Leinster hurling pre-season competitions, below the 2022 Walsh Cup. It took place on 16–30 January 2022.

There was also the Kehoe Shield, historically a secondary tournament for teams eliminated in the early stages of the Kehoe Cup, but this year (as in 2019) a separate third-ranked competition for county teams.

 won the Cup, and  won the Shield.

Format
Each team plays the other teams in a single round-robin format, earning 2 points for a win and 1 for a draw. The first-placed team wins the Kehoe Cup.

Kehoe Cup

Kehoe Shield

References

Kehoe Cup
Kehoe Cup